Peter O'Malley (born December 12, 1937) is an American former owner (1979–98) and president (1970–98) of the Los Angeles Dodgers of Major League Baseball (MLB).

Life and sports
O'Malley was born at Carson C. Peck Memorial Hospital in Brooklyn, New York, to long-time Dodger owner Walter Francis O'Malley (1903–79) and Katherine Elizabeth "Kay" Hanson (1907–79). He has a sister, Theresa "Terry" O'Malley Seidler (born 1933), who was co-owner of the team.

O'Malley graduated from the University of Pennsylvania, where he was president of his fraternity Phi Gamma Delta, and from the Wharton School of Business in 1960. In 1962, he was named the director of Dodgertown, the team's spring training headquarters located in Vero Beach, Florida. In 1965, he became president and general manager of the minor league Spokane Indians of the Pacific Coast League, where many future Dodger stars and coaches were on the roster.

In 1967 O'Malley moved to the major league club as vice president of stadium operations and in 1969, as executive vice president. He took over the presidency of the Dodgers from his father on March 17, 1970. His father, Walter, who had been Dodger Chairman of the Board since that date, died on August 9, 1979. On March 19, 1998, Rupert Murdoch and News Corporation (then the parent company of the Fox Television Network) acquired the team for what was alternately reported as $311 million or $350 million (equivalent to $ to $ million in ). This was the highest price ever paid for a US sports franchise at the time.

O'Malley relinquished the club presidency to become Dodger chairman of the board; he resigned that post at the end of the 1998 baseball season. Murdoch appointed NewsCorp subsidiary's Fox Television executives to oversee the Dodgers, with mixed results. The sale was reported as an estate and tax planning move for the O'Malley family, as Terry had ten children and Peter three. None had immediately emerged as a candidate to succeed Peter, and he acknowledged that the new economics of the game had dictated that the days of family baseball ownership, without support of a separate corporation, were largely over. NewsCorp sold the Dodgers in 2004 for $430 million (equivalent to $ million in ) to Frank McCourt, a Boston developer.

In 1996, after earlier consideration and partly owing to a phone call from Los Angeles Mayor Richard Riordan on August 22, 1995 at 3:25 p.m., O'Malley met with NFL officials to discuss the possible construction of a football-only stadium on Dodger-owned property surrounding Dodger Stadium. His plan offered solutions to a number of problems faced by the NFL in locating a team in Los Angeles, following the departure of both the Rams and the Raiders. First, it provided for scarce, centrally-located land. Second, the proposal came attached to highly regarded, established sports franchise management via the O'Malley involvement. Third, like Dodger Stadium, the new facility would be privately financed, and thus not entangled in lengthy municipal funding debates. Fourth, the plan called for alignment with an expansion team, meaning that no existing franchise would have to be moved.

Published reports indicated that O'Malley spent upwards of $1 million on an initial round of architectural renderings, land use studies and environmental impact research, and quickly garnered substantial support among NFL owners who would have to vote their approval.  As meetings continued over the next year, O'Malley received a call from Mayor Riordan, asking him to cease pursuit of the NFL franchise. The city had decided that the team should play in the Los Angeles Memorial Coliseum, already more than 70 years old, and absent any of the considerable amenities now standard in NFL stadiums. O'Malley reluctantly shelved his work and withdrew, noting that while he believed strongly in the viability of his proposal, "you can't fight City Hall." The Rams, however, would return to Los Angeles from St. Louis in 2016; a year later, the Chargers also relocated to Los Angeles from San Diego.

Hallmarks of O'Malley's baseball career were his deep involvement in the U.S. Little League program as longtime chairman of the Little League Foundation, his contribution to baseball's introduction as an Olympic sport, and his years of promotion of baseball globally, particularly in Latin America, Japan, and China, where a donation he made provided for construction of the country's first baseball stadium in 1986. Named Dodger Stadium, it is in the coastal city of Tianjin. He also funded the building of the O'Malley baseball fields in Managua, Nicaragua (1992), and Corkagh Park in Clondalkin, West Dublin, Ireland (1998), considered the main home of Irish baseball. He believed that these initiatives would bolster baseball's popularity around the world, while also benefiting both the Dodgers and the future of American baseball in general.

O'Malley has been widely credited with running the Dodgers as a professional, highly respected and emulated organization, operated with consistent methods and values, encompassing a style known as "The Dodger Way." Among his unique business practices were treating his staff to ice cream at 2 p.m. every day the Dodgers were in first place, freshly baked cookies on sell-out games and overseas trips in the offseason after particularly successful years. 

In 1997, Fortune magazine named the Dodgers as the only sports franchise selected as one of the "100 Best Companies to Work for in America." It was the third time the team had received the recognition after being named in books of that title in 1984 and 1993. 

On November 2, 2011, one day after the announcement that Frank McCourt would be selling the Dodgers, O'Malley expressed interest in repurchasing his former team. He withdrew his bid on February 21, 2012.

The inclusion of Historic Dodgertown – Vero Beach, Florida on the U.S. Civil Rights Trail is significant since it’s the only sports institution to receive this recognition. The U.S. Civil Rights Trail is a collection of churches, courthouses, schools, museums and other landmarks primarily in the Southern states where activists challenged segregation in the 1950s and 1960s to advance social justice. Historic Dodgertown was added and announced on January 31, 2019. 

In the 1940s, Dodger management, led by Branch Rickey and O'Malley’s father and partner, Walter, took the bold step to break baseball’s color barrier. In 1947, the Dodgers signed Jackie Robinson, the first Black since 1884 to sign a Major League Baseball contract. Robinson made his Dodgertown debut on March 31, 1948 and hit a home run in his first at-bat. The Dodgers signed five of the first six African-American players of the 20th century to professional baseball contracts.

Dodgertown was unique because in addition to being teammates and training on the playing fields, all the players dined together, shared living quarters in barracks and had recreational opportunities on site, a former U.S. Naval Air Station base, which closed after World War II. In 1962, Dodgertown Director O’Malley removed the concept of segregated seating, water fountains and bathrooms in Holman Stadium at Dodgertown, despite the prohibitions in the South. Local schools were not integrated until 1969.

“Dodgertown, Vero Beach played a pioneering role in advancing rights for African-Americans starting in 1948 and continuing throughout the 1950s and 1960s,” said O'Malley. “All of us connected to Dodgertown and its legacy are extremely proud of this well-deserved recognition by the U.S. Civil Rights Trail organization.”

Honours
  Order of the Rising Sun, 3rd Class, Gold Rays with Neck Ribbon (2015)
Named an “Honorary Citizen of Tianjin of the People’s Republic of     China” by the People’s Government of Tianjin (1991) 
Appointed member, Los Angeles Olympic Organizing Committee Board of Directors (1979) 
Inducted into the Irish-American Baseball Hall of Fame, New York (2013)
Medallion of Merit from the Friendly Sons of St. Patrick, Los Angeles (2013)

References

Los Angeles Dodgers executives
Los Angeles Dodgers owners
Major League Baseball executives
Major League Baseball owners
Major League Baseball team presidents
Peter
1937 births
Living people
People from Brooklyn
Wharton School of the University of Pennsylvania alumni
University of Pennsylvania alumni